The Professional Bull Riders Heroes and Legends celebration honors five divisions in the Professional Bull Riders (PBR) and Professional Rodeo Cowboys Association (PRCA), including the best bucking bulls.

History
From 1996 to 2007, the PBR awarded the Ring of Honor in the arena during the World Finals in Las Vegas, Nevada. There was no Ring of Honor ceremony in 2008.

From to 2009 to 2010, the Ring of Honor ceremony was held at the Pueblo Convention Center in conjunction with Pueblo, Colorado’s Wild, Wild West Fest in May, which included a regular-season PBR elite series event in said city. The Sharon Shoulders Award was first awarded in 2010, then came the Jim Shoulders Lifetime Achievement Award and Brand of Honor in 2011, and the Ty Murray Top Hand Award in 2018.

The PBR Heroes and Legends celebration debuted in 2011 and was held at the South Point Hotel in Las Vegas the day before the first round of every annual PBR World Finals. There was no Heroes and Legends celebration in 2020 because of COVID-19 restrictions, but the ceremony returned in 2021.

The PBR World Finals moved to Fort Worth, Texas in 2022 and now takes place in the spring after previously taking place in the autumn.

There was not a Heroes and Legends ceremony in 2022. However, it was announced in September of that year that the new PBR Hall of Fame would be unveiled in Spring 2023 at the National Cowboy & Western Heritage Museum in Oklahoma City, Oklahoma within the museum’s American Rodeo Gallery. Beginning in 2023, the Heroes and Legends celebration will now take place every September at the National Cowboy & Western Heritage Museum prior to the start of the annual PBR Team Series event in Oklahoma City. The PBR Hall of Fame’s construction is expected to be completed by 2024 or 2025.

Ring of Honor 
The PBR Ring of Honor is the equivalent of a Hall of Fame for bull riders. The PBR created this award in 1996 to recognize those who have had a "significant and lasting contribution to the sport of professional bull riding". Honorees may be PBR bull riders, but some PRCA bull riders have also been honored, for example, icon Lane Frost. "It is both a physical ring and a fellowship of men." This honor is bestowed upon "select bull riders whose contributions to the sport of bull riding last beyond their success in the competitive arena". The award is "symbolized by a custom-made, gold-and-diamond ring engraved with the honoree's name and the PBR logo". Recipients are honored with this award during a ceremony at the PBR World Finals near the end of the year.

It was created in 1996 with the inaugural induction of ProRodeo Hall of Fame members Jim Shoulders and Ted Nuce.

The PRCA, which sanctions traditional rodeo, has the ProRodeo Hall of Fame. The Bull Riding Hall of Fame located in Fort Worth, Texas, is not associated with the PBR.

Recipients

2021
 Robson Palermo

2019
 Guilherme Marchi

2018

 Gary Leffew

2017

 Ricky Bolin
 Lyle Sankey

2016
 Owen Washburn

2015
 Luke Snyder

2014
 Bobby Berger
 Adam Carrillo
 Gilbert Carrillo

2013
 Bubba Dunn
 Chris Shivers

2012
 Ross Coleman
 Mike White

2011
 Tater Porter
 Brent Thurman

2010
 Randy Bernard
 Jim Sharp

2009
 J.W. Hart
 Justin McBride
 Adriano Moraes

2007
 Phil Lyne
 Carl Nafzger

2006
 Bobby DelVecchio
 Cody Snyder

2005
 Troy Dunn
 Michael Gaffney
 Bobby Steiner

2004
 David Fournier
 Charles Sampson

2003
 Cody Custer
 Myrtis Dightman
 Aaron Semas

2002
 Denny Flynn
 Daryl Mills
 Ty Murray

2001
 Wacey Cathey

2000
 Clint Branger

1999
 Lane Frost
 Tuff Hedeman
 Jerome Robinson

1998
 Jerome Davis
 Larry Mahan

1997
 Donnie Gay

1996
 Cody Lambert
 Ted Nuce
 Jim Shoulders
 Harry Tompkins
Source

Sharon Shoulders Award 

This award recognizes women who have supported professional bull riding; "those whose work, partnership and faith have been as integral to the sport as the athletes themselves." These are bull rider wives who have shared the burdens of a bull rider in his life and in the sport and helped enable him to contribute to the sport. It is named for the wife of Jim Shoulders. The PBR created his award in 2010 and honored inaugural inductee Tiffany Davis.

Recipients
 2021 - Terri Gay (wife of Donnie Gay)
 2019 - Kylie Shivers (wife of Chris Shivers)
 2018 - Jill McBride (wife of Justin McBride) 
 2017 - Julie Carrillo (wife of Gilbert Carrillo)
 2016 - LeAnn Hart (wife of J.W. Hart)
 2015 - Robyn Gaffney (wife of Michael Gaffney)
 2014 - Stacey Custer (wife of Cody Custer)
 2013 - Flavia Moraes (wife of Adriano Moraes)
 2012 - Jackie Dunn (wife of Troy Dunn)
 2011 - Leanne Lambert (wife of Cody Lambert)
 2010 - Tiffany Davis (wife of Jerome Davis)
Source

Jim Shoulders Lifetime Achievement Award 

This award is named after Jim Shoulders, who won 16 world titles and is recognized in his field as possibly the greatest western-sports athlete of all time. This award recognizes some of the many non-bull riders who have made a tangible contribution to the sport and whose efforts have built the PBR, including stock contractors, contract personnel, PBR employees, and more. It was first awarded in 2011.

Recipients
2021

 Michael Gaughan
 Sean Gleason

2019

 Mack Altizer
 Neal Gay

2018

 Joe Baumgartner
 Dr. J. Pat Evans
 Barry Frank

2017

Doug Scott
 Bill Selman

2016

 Dr. Tandy Freeman

2015

 Brett Hoffman

2014

David Allen

2013

Cotton Rosser

2012

Tom Teague

2011

Rob Smets
Source

Brand of Honor 

First awarded in 2011 to Little Yellow Jacket, the Brand of Honor is awarded to a bull for superlative performance in the PBR. The PBR recognizes that "there are two great athletes in every ride". Brand of Honor bulls are elite athletes who have gone above and beyond in the sport. In 2016, Bushwacker was awarded the Brand of Honor. This three-time World Champion bucking bull, now retired, is universally considered to be the best in bull riding history.

Recipients
 2021 - Asteroid
 2019 - Bodacious
 2018 - Pearl Harbor
 2017 - Mossy Oak Mudslinger
 2016 - Bushwacker
 2015 - Chicken on a Chain
 2014 - Bones
 2013 - Red Wolf
 2012 - Dillinger
 2011 - Little Yellow Jacket
Source

Ty Murray Top Hand Award 
First awarded in 2018 to Trevor Brazile, Lewis Feild, and Tom Ferguson, the Ty Murray Top Hand Award, is awarded to a rodeo athlete who is not eligible for the Ring of Honor Award. The award connects the PBR with its traditional past. Athletes are chosen who represent strong values and character who have made a significant mark on the sport. The award is named after 9 time Professional Rodeo Cowboys Association (PRCA) World Champion and Ring of Honor awardee Ty Murray, a co-founder of the PBR and current television commentator.

Recipients 
2021

 Guy Allen

2019

 Larry Mahan
 Phil Lyne

2018

 Trevor Brazile
 Lewis Feild
 Tom Ferguson
Source

Professional Bull Riders Champions

Heroes and Legends lists the Ring of Honor, Sharon Shoulders Award, Jim Shoulders Lifetime Achievement Award, Brand of Honor, Ty Murray Top Hand Award, Mason Lowe Award, and Golden Barrel Awards. The List of Professional Bull Riders Champions article presents a list of major champions and honors won by Professional Bull Riders.

See also
 Professional Bull Riders
 Professional Rodeo Cowboys Association
 Canadian Professional Rodeo Association
 Rodeo Hall of Fame
 Bull Riding Hall of Fame
 ProRodeo Hall of Fame
 Canadian Pro Rodeo Hall of Fame
 List of Professional Bull Riders Champions
 List of ProRodeo Hall of Fame inductees
 List of Canadian Pro Rodeo Hall of Fame inductees

References

External links
 Official Site

 
Cowboy halls of fame
Sports halls of fame
Halls of fame in Colorado
Rodeo in the United States
Professional Bull Riders
Rodeo champions
Awards established in 1992
Sports in Pueblo, Colorado
Lists of sports awards